Flagrant may refer to:

Flagrant foul, a term in basketball
In flagrante delicto, caught in the act of committing a crime

See also
Obvious (disambiguation)